An algorithm is an unambiguous method of solving a specific problem.

Algorithm or algorhythm may also refer to:

Music
 The Algorithm, a French musical project
 Algorithm (album), a 2013 album by My Heart to Fear, and its title track “Algorithm”
 Algorythm (album), a 2018 album by Beyond Creation
 Algorhythm (Todrick Hall album), a 2022 album by Todrick Hall
 Snoop Dogg Presents Algorithm, a 2021 compilation album by Snoop Dogg
 Algorythm, a 1994 album by Boxcar
 "Algorithm" (song), a 2018 song by Muse
 "Algorhythm", a 2018 song by Childish Gambino
 Algorythm Records, an imprint of the drum and bass group Counterstrike

Other
 Algorithm (C++), components that perform algorithmic operations on containers and other sequences
 Algorithms (journal), a technical periodical
 A temporal inversion device in the 2020 science-fiction film Tenet

See also 

 Algorithmic (disambiguation)
 Algorism
 Ruleset (disambiguation)